The Childhood Cancer Parents Alliance (CCPA) — previously known as The National Alliance of Childhood Cancer Parent Organisations (NACCPO)  — is a UK registered cancer charity to aid the stability of children's lives when they have been diagnosed with cancer. The charity focuses on the wellbeing and support of the whole family to bring together member groups to help the family in difficult times during treatment and medication.

History 
CCPA was originally formed as NACCPO in 1999 at a meeting with Mike Stevens, a Pediatric Oncologist at Birmingham Children's Hospital.

Purpose 

CCPA was set up to aid families where a child had been diagnosed with cancer. Thousands of children are diagnosed every year, which has a dramatic effect on their family due to medical requirements, costs, and disruption to normal daily life. CCPA's aim is to render assistance by various means such as providing holidays an sponsored events, such as celebrity football matches

Member groups 
CCPA has more than 35 member groups that combine efforts for their specific support

See also 
 Cancer in the United Kingdom

References

External links
 Charity Giving: https://web.archive.org/web/20130119133251/http://www.charitygiving.co.uk/minisites/default.asp?subname=naccpo
 SW Cancer Hub: http://swcancerhub.org/thehub/2011/08/naccpo-has-now-changed-to-ccpa

Cancer organisations based in the United Kingdom
Health charities in the United Kingdom
1999 establishments in the United Kingdom
Organizations established in 1999